Eric Sutton (born September 5, 1998) is a professional gridiron football defensive back for the Toronto Argonauts of the Canadian Football League (CFL).

Early life
Sutton was born in Regina, Saskatchewan, when his father, Eric Sutton, was playing for the Saskatchewan Roughriders. He spent his childhood with his mother in Los Angeles and moved to Miami in middle school where he started playing football. He moved again to Dallas for grade 10 where the high level of coaching that he received led him to focus on professional football aspirations.

College career

SMU Mustangs
Sutton first played college football for the SMU Mustangs from 2016 to 2019. He played in 37 games, starting in five of them, where he had 45 tackles while playing extensively on special teams. He was injured in 2019 which he was able to use as a redshirt season.

Texas State Bobcats
In 2020, Sutton transferred to Texas State University in order to play more at the nickelback position. However, he did not play in 2020 due to the COVID-19 pandemic. In 2021, his last season of college eligibility, he played in ten games for the Bobcats where he recorded 22 tackles.

Professional career
Sutton was drafted in the sixth round, 53rd overall, in the 2022 CFL Draft by the Toronto Argonauts and signed with the team on May 10, 2022. Following training camp, he was placed on the team's practice roster, but made his professional debut in the team's second game on June 25, 2022, against the BC Lions, where he had one special teams tackle. He recorded the first two defensive tackles of his career on July 24, 2022, in a game against the Saskatchewan Roughriders and tallied a career-high five total tackles against the Ottawa Redblacks on September 24, 2022.

References

External links
 Toronto Argonauts bio

1998 births
Living people
American football defensive backs
Canadian football defensive backs
Players of American football from Texas
Players of Canadian football from Texas
SMU Mustangs football players
Texas State Bobcats football players
Toronto Argonauts players
Canadian people of African-American descent